Beholder is a Russian adventure video game about life in a totalitarian police state. The game was developed by Warm Lamp Games and published by Alawar Entertainment on November 9, 2016. The game is supported on Windows, macOS, Linux, Android, and iOS.

Story 
Beholder is inspired by the dystopian works of George Orwell, Aldous Huxley, and Ray Bradbury.

Carl is a government-installed landlord in a totalitarian state. The State appoints Carl to spy on the tenants. The player can bug apartments while tenants are away, search their belongings for whatever can threaten the authority of the State, and profile them. The State requires the player to report anyone capable of violating the law or plotting subversive activities.

The game offers the player the choice of either following the commands of the Government or siding with the people who suffer from the oppressive directives.

Each game character has its personality, circumstances, and issues. Every decision that a player makes affects the way the story unfolds. The game has multiple endings, each of them being the direct result of decisions made by the player.

Development
Beholder was developed by the Russian team at Warm Lamp Games, located in Barnaul. The team was created based on the Barnaul division of Alawar Stargaze. The Work on the project began in October 2015. The prototype of Beholder  contained elements of the economic game, which were expressed in the fact that the residents of the house paid rent to the main character for housing, and the player had to improve his living conditions, Later the creators decided to remove them. On April 26, 2016, the game appeared on the Kickstarter crowdfunding platform, where the developers requested $25,000 to fund the game's creation. During the development, this amount was never needed, and the decision was made to close the funding before the deadline. The game was also introduced on Steam Greenlight and, on May 9, reached 10th place among the projects submitted for approval by the community. During game creation, developers focused on games like Papers, Please and This War of Mine, as well as the works of George Orwell and Aldous Huxley.

Release and DLC 
On October 6, 2016, a demo of Beholder appeared on the Steam store.

The game was released for Windows, MacOS and Linux on November 9, 2016. On May 17, 2017, the game was released for iOS and Android operating systems. On January 16 and 19, 2018, it was released for PlayStation 4 and Xbox One respectively.

On May 18, 2017, Steam released a DLC called Beholder - Blissful Sleep. In it, the government issues a bill which exposes all citizens who have reached the age of 85 to euthanasia. Hector Medina, the landlord succeeded by Carl Stein, is about 65 years old, but due to an error, Hector's age has been corrected to "85 years old". The player has to choose to either submit to fate and fall asleep with a "Blissful sleep" or to avoid euthanasia by various methods. Unlike in the base game, the protagonist has no family, except for a cat, and his 30-year-old son, who works on the construction of a railway to the north.

Reception

Awards
Beholder has been nominated and won several conference awards:

 Excellence in Game Design and Best Indie Game awards at the Minsk DevGAMM Conference 2016.
 Best Adventure Game @ IGN Russia
 Winner in Entertainment Category @ GDWC, 2016
 Best in Play @ Game Developers Conference, GDC Play 2017
 Most Creative & Original Game, Best Indie Game @ Game Connection America, 2017

Sequel
A sequel to the game, Beholder 2, was released for Windows, macOS, and Linux on December 4, 2018, for Android and iOS on August 16, 2019, for Nintendo Switch and PlayStation 4 on October 22, 2019, and for Xbox One on April 9, 2020.

A third game, Beholder 3, was released for Windows on March 3, 2022 and PlayStation 4 and 5, Xbox One and Xbox Series X|S on December 15, 2022.

Short film

Russian filmmakers Nikita Ordynskiy and Liliya Tkach released a live-action short film for Beholder, with Russian actor Evgeniy Stychkin playing the role of Carl. The film was released onto YouTube on February 1, 2019.

References

External links 
 
 Beholder review at PC Gamer
 Beholder review at Destructoid
 Beholder review at Rock, Paper, Shotgun
 Beholder review at Gamespot

2016 video games
Adventure games
Android (operating system) games
Dystopian video games
Fiction about government
IOS games
Linux games
MacOS games
Nintendo Switch games
PlayStation 4 games
Single-player video games
Strategy video games
Video games developed in Russia
Video games with alternate endings
Windows games
Xbox Cloud Gaming games
Xbox One games
Alawar Entertainment games